Jessica Camposano is a Colombian swimmer that competed in the women's 200 metre freestyle event at the 2017 World Aquatics Championships, and has set multiple national records.

References

External links
 

1992 births
Living people
Colombian  female swimmers
Place of birth missing (living people)
Swimmers at the 2015 Pan American Games
Colombian female freestyle swimmers
Pan American Games competitors for Colombia
Competitors at the 2014 Central American and Caribbean Games
Central American and Caribbean Games silver medalists for Colombia
Central American and Caribbean Games bronze medalists for Colombia
Central American and Caribbean Games medalists in swimming
21st-century Colombian women